Sirch (also Romanized as Sīrch and Sīroch; also known as Sirj and Sirūj) is a village in Sirch Rural District, Shahdad District, Kerman County, Kerman Province, Iran. At the 2006 census, its population was 1,688, in 445 families.
Despite being close to Shahdad, it does not have desert climate.

References 

Populated places in Kerman County